U.S. Route 99 (US 99) was the main north–south United States Numbered Highway on the West Coast of the United States until 1964, running from Calexico, California, on the Mexican border to Blaine, Washington, on the Canadian border. Known also as the "Golden State Highway" and "The Main Street of California", US 99 was an important route in California throughout much of the 1930s as a route for Dust Bowl immigrant farm workers to traverse the state. It was assigned in 1926 and existed until it was replaced for the most part by Interstate 5 (I-5). A large section in the Central Valley is now State Route 99 (SR 99).

Route description

Mexico to Los Angeles
The highway started at the border with Baja California in Calexico, California. It then continued north along the western shore of the Salton Sea. The stretch is now known as SR 86. US 99 continued along present-day SR 111 through Coachella to its intersection at Dillon Road with another major US route signed as both US 60 and US 70.

Now signed as US 60/US 70/US 99, the highway continued north through Indio and turned west through the San Gorgonio Pass toward Los Angeles paralleling the route of modern I-10. In Beaumont, US 60 split off on its own westward trek to Los Angeles. The highway through Banning and Beaumont (known as Ramsey Street in Banning and Sixth Street in Beaumont) was bypassed by the new superhighway version of US 60/US 70/US 99 that would later become part of I-10. The edges of the old US 60 shield at the replacement interchange's overhead sign are clearly visible today underneath the SR 60 shield that covers it.  Prior to the construction of the superhighway, US 99 entered Los Angeles on Valley Boulevard, multiplexed with US 70.

US 70 ended in downtown LA while US 99 turned north once again more or less following the route of today's I-5 (San Fernando Road in the San Fernando Valley before the construction of I-5), up and over the Tehachapi Mountains to the San Joaquin Valley. US 99's original alignment over the rugged Tehachapi Mountains was known in its earliest days as the Ridge Route, the first highway directly linking the Los Angeles Basin to the San Joaquin Valley. Built in 1915, the alignment between Castaic and SR 138 to Gorman is listed on the National Register of Historic Places. The original Ridge Route at the south and the Grapevine at the north was an exceptionally twisty and narrow two-lane concrete road that was very slow to travel along the ridge precipices and was considered dangerous to drive in the days of the Model A Ford and overheating trucks. It was bypassed in 1933 by the three-lane "Alternate Ridge Route", some of which now sits at the bottom of Pyramid Lake. Dropping down from the Tehachapis, US 99 entered the San Joaquin Valley at the bottom of the steep Grapevine grade (the foot of the Tejon Pass) and continued north.

Los Angeles
When it was first designated in late 1926, US 99 ran with US 66 from San Bernardino via Pasadena to Los Angeles, turning north there to San Fernando. The route was signed in 1928. This alignment remained through 1933, but by 1942 it had moved to its own alignment (concurrent with US 70, as well as US 60 west of Pomona) from San Bernardino to Los Angeles. This alignment used Garvey Avenue from Pomona, turning onto Ramona Boulevard in Alhambra to reach Macy Street (now Cesar E. Chavez Avenue) near downtown Los Angeles. It turned north at Figueroa Street, running through the Figueroa Street Tunnels and turning off at Avenue 26 to reach San Fernando Road. When the San Bernardino Freeway, Santa Ana Freeway and Pasadena Freeway were completed, it was routed onto them, continuing to exit at Avenue 26. In 1962, with the completion of the Golden State Freeway northeast of downtown, US 99 was moved onto it, bypassing the Santa Ana Freeway, Four Level Interchange and Figueroa Street Tunnels.

Los Angeles to Sacramento

From Los Angeles US 99 followed San Fernando Road through Glendale and Burbank to Sylmar. From 1937 to 1964 it shared this routing with US 6; the remaining stretch of the highway through the Santa Clarita Valley is named "The Old Road". The Old Road starts near the Newhall Pass Interchange, just south of Santa Clarita, eventually crossing under present-day I-5. As the road now winds north, passing by Pico Canyon Road, it reaches McBean Parkway near the California Institute of the Arts, College of the Canyons and Six Flags Magic Mountain. In Castaic the Old Road becomes a suburban street and ends at Oak Hill Court, just outside Castaic. A substantial portion of the road is submerged beneath Pyramid Lake; the northern side is now the lake's public access road, while the southern side is access to the dam.

US 99 then headed over Tejon Pass to the San Joaquin Valley.  Just north of the route's entry to the valley, I-5 splits off from US 99, and US 99 continued on the current route of SR 99, to Bakersfield, Fresno, and Sacramento. Many older segments of the highway between the "Grapevine" and Sacramento still exist as local streets, many of them having "Golden State" in their names (such as Golden State Avenue, Golden State Boulevard, Golden State Highway).

Sacramento to Oregon
North of Sacramento, the route divided into US 99W and US 99E.  US 99W co-routed with US 40 west to Davis, in city as Olive Drive. The route continued as Richards Boulevard, 1st Street, B Street, and Russell Boulevard before turning north on what is now SR 113 into Woodland to meet and parallel I-5 near the town of Yolo. From there, the route parallels the current I-5, entering Corning from the South as Old Corning road, turning east onto Solano Street before turning north again on 3rd street continuing to Red Bluff, where it became Main Street.  All of the old inter-town original roadway still exists, signed as 99W, CR 99 or CR 99W.

From Sacramento US 99E followed I-80 (first the current business route, then the actual route) to Roseville, then north along SR 65 to Olivehurst, from where it followed SR 70 to Marysville.  From Marysville it followed SR 20 across the Feather River to Yuba City, then along the current SR 99 north to Red Bluff, where it rejoined 99W at Main Street and Antelope Boulevard.

From Red Bluff US 99 continued north along the same route as I-5, except that it went through Redding along present SR 273. and SR 263 from Yreka to near Black Mountain.

From Redding, the highway went through the small town of Mountain Gate, before plunging into what is now Shasta Lake. In drought years, many of the old bridges, road cuts, and guardrail can be seen when the water in the lake resides. After passing Shasta Lake, the highway had to be designed around very difficult terrain. The Sacramento River Canyon was a big task to overcome, but to this day, many bridges can still be found and visited, reminding us of how far our engineering has come. Once into Siskiyou County, the highway meanders through Dunsmuir, heading north to Mount Shasta, and from there, up to Weed. In Weed, the highway becomes SR 265 for a very short distance, before heading north towards the town of Gazelle.

A  stretch of two-lane county road known as "Old Highway 99" exists in Siskiyou County, between Weed and Yreka, in the same form as it did when it was US 99. It roughly parallels I-5, but at one point diverges from it by a distance of several miles.  Once north of Yreka, the highway becomes SR 263, merges with SR 96, and heads north to Hornbrook. Much of the old highway between Hornbrook and Oregon has been demolished or currently sits on private property.

History

By 1925 the future Highway 99 was 99% paved from Los Angeles to Sacramento; the rest of the state was finished about 1932. Sections were expanded to four lanes starting in the late 1930s and by 1961 Los Angeles to Sacramento was all four-lane, much of it being full freeway.

By 1968 US 99 was decommissioned with the completion of I-5 in Washington and California, but the highway's phasing out actually began July 1, 1964, thanks to the passage of Collier Senate Bill No. 64 on September 20, 1963. The bill launched a program to simplify California's complicated highway numbering system and eliminate concurrent postings like the aforementioned US 60/US 70/US 99. The highways that replaced it are:

SR 111 and SR 86 between the Mexican border and Indio.
I-10, replacing US 60 and US 70 between Indio and Los Angeles as well.
US 101 and SR 110 in downtown Los Angeles.
I-5 from north of downtown all the way to its modern-day split in Wheeler Ridge before US 99's final decommissioning in 1968.

The  stretch between Wheeler Ridge and Red Bluff is signed as SR 99 which makes it California's second-longest state highway behind SR 1. However, the newly enacted Historic U.S. Route 99 extends from Indio starting from I-10 in the Coachella Valley all the way down the Imperial Valley to Calexico on the Mexican border with Mexicali, Baja California, Mexico.

Major intersections

Suffixed routes

U.S. Route 99W was a short-lived alternate of US 99 in the Central Valley of California, running from north of Manteca via French Camp to Stockton. At the same time, from roughly 1929 to 1933, U.S. Route 99E ran to the east, having the same termini as US 99W.

US 99W ran along French Camp Road and El Dorado Street, while US 99E used present SR 99 and Mariposa Road. The northern end of each in Stockton is unclear; it may have been at Charter Way and Wilson Way or at Harding Way and Wilson Way.

Prior to the establishment of the United States Numbered Highways in 1926, the main Los Angeles-Sacramento route, pre-1964 Legislative Route 4, ran from Manteca to Stockton via French Camp (later US 99W). At French Camp, pre-1964 Legislative Route 5 split to the southwest to reach the San Francisco Bay Area via Altamont Pass. The Lincoln Highway used Route 4 from Sacramento to French Camp and Route 5 over Altamont Pass.

In November 1926, Route 4 was defined as part of US 99 and Route 5 (to San Jose) became US 48. California's U.S. Routes were not marked until 1928, and US 99 had not yet been split into US 99E and US 99W.

Around 1929, Route 4 was realigned between north of Manteca and Stockton. This became US 99E, and the old route became US 99W. Route 5 was extended north from French Camp to Stockton, but US 48 continued to end at US 99W. US 48 became an extension of US 50 c. 1931, running concurrently with US 99 from Sacramento to Stockton and US 99W to French Camp. Around 1933, US 99W was dropped, and US 99E became part of US 99. Most of former US 99E is now part of SR 99 but former US 99W has been bypassed by I-5.

US 99E major intersections

US 99W major intersections

See also

References

External links

Museum of the Siskiyou Trail
Information on the Ridge Route
Ridge Route Preservation Organization
 (Photos, text, TV shows)
Clark's Travel Center and Route 99 Museum, Indio, California
Finding Historic Route 99
Virtual Tour of US 99 in Southern California
US-99 endpoint photos
California @ AARoads.com - Historic U.S. Route 99
California Highways: US 99
Historic Highway 99 Association of California

 
099
099
Historic trails and roads in California
99
Roads on the National Register of Historic Places in California
99
099
099
National Register of Historic Places in Los Angeles County, California